Natali Veronica Germanotta (born March 10, 1992) is an American fashion designer and stylist. She founded the fashion label Topo Studio. She is the younger sister of singer Lady Gaga.

Early life 
Germanotta was born on March 10, 1992, in New York City to business executives Joseph Germanotta and Cynthia Bissett and grew up on the Upper West Side of Manhattan. She was raised in the Catholic faith and is of Italian descent. Germanotta is the younger sister of singer and actress Lady Gaga. She attended the Convent of the Sacred Heart, a private all-girls Roman Catholic school located on the Upper East Side. After graduating, she studied fashion at Parsons School of Design, a constituent college of The New School.

Career 
In February 2016, Germanotta and her sister, Lady Gaga partnered with Mattel's Monster High, in conjunction with the Born This Way Foundation as part of the #KindMonsters campaign, to create a doll for the franchise.

Germanotta works as a fashion designer, and founded the fashion label Topo Studio. In 2011, she created costumes for an off-Broadway show, Simon Says. She has designed for and styled Lady Gaga, including for a spread in Harper's Bazaar in 2014. She worked as a stylist on set for the film A Star Is Born (2018) and also designed outfits for Gaga's Jazz & Piano residency (2019–2022), as well as concert tours the Cheek to Cheek Tour (2014–2015) and The Chromatica Ball (2022). Talking about working together, she said: "I like to close my eyes after combing through reference images, and imagine my sister singing. [...] [Collaborating] never feels like work. It feels really unrestrained and free, from start to finish."

Videography

Film

Music videos

References 

Living people
1992 births
American fashion designers
American people of Italian descent
American Roman Catholics
Convent of the Sacred Heart (NYC) alumni
Fashion stylists
Germanotta family
Parsons School of Design alumni
People from the Upper West Side
American women fashion designers
21st-century American women